Doan is a surname commonly found in North America, Europe, and Vietnam.

American and European surname
In North America and Europe, the surname "Doan" is a variation of Done, Donn, Donne, Doane, and Doune, among others. Notable people from North America and Europe with the surname "Doan" include:
 Catriona Le May Doan (born 1970), Canadian speed skater
 Christine Doan (born 1949), former Michigan-born Australian equestrian, sustainability advocate and technology entrepreneur
 Daniel Doan (1914–1993), American writer
 Ebenezer Doan (1772–1866), Canadian architect
 Jack Doan (born 1972), American wrestling referee 
 Jenny Doan, founder of the Missouri Star Quilting Company in Hamilton, Missouri
 Joshua Gwillen Doan (1811–1839), Canadian farmer and tanner
 Lurita Doan (born 1958), American politician and businesswoman
 Shane Doan (born 1976), Canadian professional ice hockey player
 Walt Doan (1887–1935), American baseball player
 William Doan (1792–1847), American politician
 Doan Outlaws, an outlaw gang active in Bucks County, Pennsylvania during the American Revolution

Vietnamese surname
 Notable people from Vietnam with the surname "Doan" include:
 Đoàn Văn Khâm, a poet, honorary title, Ministry of Public Works, under Emperor Lý Nhân Tông (1072–1128)
 Đoàn Thượng (1184–1228), a general under the Ly dynasty
 Đoàn Nhữ Hài (1280–1335), a general, honorary title under three generations of the Tran dynasty
 Đoàn Xuân Lôi, a valedictorian in National Examination (1384) hosted by King father Trần Nghệ Tông
 Đoàn Công Uẩn, a great general under the Le dynasty
 Đoàn Nhân Công, a second valedictorian in National Examination (1448) hosted by King Lê Nhân Tông
 Đoàn Thị Điểm (1705–1748), the classical-Annamese female poet under the Le dynasty,
 Đoàn Tử Quang (1818–1928), compelled by his mom to take and pass the National Examination at age 80 (1900) under the Nguyen dynasty
 Đoàn Đình Niêu, Vietnamese poet 
 Đoàn Như Khuê, Vietnamese poet
 Đoàn Giỏi, Vietnamese writer 
 Võ Phiến official name Đoàn Thế Nhơn, Vietnamese writer
 Đoàn Nguyên Đức, businessman, chairman of Hoang Anh Gia Lai Group

Other
 Doan, Alberta, locality in Red Deer County, Alberta, Canada
 Ritsu Doan (born 1998), Japanese footballer
 Doan, Down, a 593 m peak in the Mourne Mountains in County Down, Northern Ireland

 Doan Brook, a river in Northeastern Ohio.

See also
 Doane
 Doans, Indiana

Vietnamese-language surnames